Dominique Paturel (3 April 1931 – 28 February 2022) was a French actor.

Early life
Paturel was born on 3 April 1931 in Le Havre and was educated at the Institution Saint-Joseph. He moved to Paris in 1951, and he graduated from the École de la rue Blanche.

Career
Paturel started his career at the Théâtre National Populaire in the 1950s. He subsequently acted at the Théâtre de l'Odéon. Meanwhile, he acted in films in the 1960s-1980s.

Paturel dubbed J. R. Ewing in Dallas. He also dubbed Terence Hill, Omar Sharif and Anthony Hopkins.

Personal life
Paturel died in Saint-Brieuc on 28 February 2022, at the age of 90.

References

External links

1931 births
2022 deaths
Commandeurs of the Ordre des Arts et des Lettres
French male film actors
French male stage actors
French male video game actors
French male voice actors
Male actors from Le Havre